Kasper may refer to:

 Kasper (surname), a list of people with the surname
 Kasper (given name), a list of people with the given name
 Käsper (surname), an Estonian surname
 Kasper (singer), Korean rapper
 Kasperle or Kasper, a traditional puppet character from Austria and Germany
 Michael Kasprowicz (born 1972), Australian cricketer nicknamed "Kasper"
 a division of Jones Apparel Group

See also
 Casper (disambiguation)
 Kaspar
 Kašpar